Joynal Abedin is a Bangladesh Awami League politician and the former Member of Parliament of Meherpur-1.

Career
Abedin was elected to parliament from Meherpur-1 as a Bangladesh Awami League candidate in 2008.

References

Awami League politicians
9th Jatiya Sangsad members
1954 births
Living people